Howard Lake is a lake in Cook County, Minnesota, in the United States.

Howard Lake was named for a local mining prospector.

See also
List of lakes in Minnesota

References

Lakes of Minnesota
Lakes of Cook County, Minnesota